In mathematics, a prime power is a positive integer which is a positive integer power of a single prime number.

The sequence of prime powers begins:
2, 3, 4, 5, 7, 8, 9, 11, 13, 16, 17, 19, 23, 25, 27, 29, 31, 32, 37, 41, 43, 47, 49, 53, 59, 61, 64, 67, 71, 73, 79, 81, 83, 89, 97, 101, 103, 107, 109, 113, 121, 125, 127, 128, 131, 137, 139, 149, 151, 157, 163, 167, 169, 173, 179, 181, 191, 193, 197, 199, 211, 223, 227, 229, 233, 239, 241, 243, 251, … .

The prime powers are those positive integers that are divisible by exactly one prime number; in particular, the number 1 is not a prime power. Prime powers are also called primary numbers, as in the primary decomposition.

Properties

Algebraic properties
Prime powers are powers of prime numbers. Every prime power (except powers of 2) has a primitive root; thus the multiplicative group of integers modulo pn (that is, the group of units of the ring Z/pnZ) is cyclic.

The number of elements of a finite field is always a prime power and conversely, every prime power occurs as the number of elements in some finite field (which is unique up to isomorphism).

Combinatorial properties
A property of prime powers used frequently in analytic number theory is that the set of prime powers which are not prime is a small set in the sense that the infinite sum of their reciprocals converges, although the primes are a large set.

Divisibility properties
The totient function (φ) and sigma functions (σ0) and (σ1) of a prime power are calculated by the formulas

All prime powers are deficient numbers. A prime power pn is an n-almost prime. It is not known whether a prime power pn can be a member of an amicable pair. If there is such a number, then pn must be greater than 101500 and n must be greater than 1400.

See also
Almost prime
Fermi–Dirac prime
Perfect power
Semiprime

References

Further reading
Elementary Number Theory. Jones, Gareth A. and Jones, J. Mary. Springer-Verlag London Limited. 1998.

Prime numbers
Exponentials
Number theory
Integer sequences